Naam may refer to:

 Nāma, an act of worship of God by Hindus and Sikhs
 Naam (1953 film)
 Naam (1986 film), Hindi-language film starring Sanjay Dutt, Kumar Gaurav and Nutan
 Naam (2003 film)
 Naam (2018 film)
 Northwest African American Museum in Seattle, Washington, USA
 NAAM (alliance), an alliance in Illyriad which stands for Non-Aligned-Alliance-Movement.
 NAAm, the synthetic auxin 1-Naphthaleneacetamide